The 4th constituency of Eure-et-Loir is a French legislative constituency in the Eure-et-Loir département.  It has been held since 2007 by Philippe Vigier, who won the 2007 and 2012 elections in the first round.

Assembly Members

Election results

2022 

 
 
|-
| colspan="8" bgcolor="#E9E9E9"|
|-

2017

2012

Philippe Vigier won the constituency in the first round

2007

References

Sources
 Official results of French elections from 1998: 

4